The 2012 Coastal Carolina Chanticleers football team represented Coastal Carolina University in the 2012 NCAA Division I FCS football season. They were led by first-year head coach Joe Moglia and played their home games at Brooks Stadium. They are a member of the Big South Conference. They finished the season 8–5, 5–1 in Big South play to be conference co–champions with Liberty and Stony Brook. They received the Big South's automatic bid into the FCS playoffs, where they defeated Bethune-Cookman in the first round before falling in the second round to Old Dominion.

Schedule

Source: Schedule

References

Coastal Carolina
Coastal Carolina Chanticleers football seasons
Big South Conference football champion seasons
Coastal Carolina
Coastal Carolina Chanticleers football